The Studebaker Big Six was an automobile produced by the Studebaker Corporation of South Bend, Indiana between 1918 and 1926, being designated the Model EG (1918–21), the EK (1922–24) and the EP (1925–26); its name was due to the 127" wheelbase in comparison to the Studebaker Special Six at 120". In 1927, it was renamed the President (ES) pending introduction of a smaller and smoother straight-eight engine for new top-of-the-range models after January 1928.

Early models

All Studebaker models for 1918 represented an important milestone for the automaker because they represented a clean break from the legacy of E-M-F Studebaker had been producing.

Between 1918 and 1920, the Big Six was offered only as a four-door touring car, the most popular body style for automobiles at the time. As the price of enclosed cars came down and consumers discovered the benefits of closed and semi-closed passenger compartments, a wider variety of body styles was made available beginning with the 1921 model year.  By 1926, the Big Six was available in a variety of body styles, including a dual-cowl Phaeton and a Berline (sedan).

1918 and 1919 Big Sixes were powered by Studebaker's 354 in³ (5.8-liter) Straight-6 engine, which produced  at 2000 rpm.  By 1926, the engine was delivering  at 2400 rpm.  The car's wheelbase was varied between 1918  and 1926 when the car was available in either short  or long  wheelbases.

1920s production

In the 1920s, twelve of the fourteen Arizona counties issued Studebakers to their sheriffs, because of their reputation for power, reliability, and ability to withstand hard use and bad roads. In 1925, the company published a pamphlet about the Arizona sheriffs' Studebakers, and named their Big Six Sport Phaeton model the Sheriff. One of the Arizona sheriffs' Big Six cars has been restored, and is on display at the Arizona Historical Society museum in Tucson.

Big Six President

In 1927, the model gained the transitional model name Big Six President as Studebaker began the process of converting all of its model names away from engine-type-based, and towards the more evocative Dictator (Standard Six) and Commander (Special Six). In the case of the Big Six President, 1928 would mark the introduction of Studebaker's famed 313-in³ Straight-8 which developed  at 2600 rpm. The larger straight-six engine was utilised in the GB Commander before being replaced with a 248-in³ engine in 1929, marking the end of the line for the famous Big Six.

These sixes were the last descendants of rugged cars designed for poor roads in the early 20th century—loaded with torque and massively strong in construction. They were not suited to the higher cruising speeds which were made possible by better roads in later years.

Standard Big Six Sedan specifications (1926 data) 
 Color - Studebaker blue with black upper structure
 Seating capacity – Seven
 Wheelbase - 
 Wheels - Wood
 Tires -  balloon
 Service brakes - contracting on rear
 Emergency brakes - contracting drum on rear of transmission
 Engine  - Six cylinder, vertical, cast en bloc, ; head removable; valves in side;   NACC rating

 Lubrication - Force feed
 Crankshaft - Four bearing
 Radiator – Tubular
 Cooling – Water pump
 Ignition –Battery
 Starting system – Two unit
 Voltage – Six to eight
 Wiring – Single
 Fuel feed – Vacuum
 Clutch – Dry plate, single disc
 Transmission –3-speed manual (3 forward, 1 reverse)) sliding
 Final drive – Spiral bevel gear
 Rear springs – Semi-elliptic
 Rear axle – Semi-floating
 Steering gear – Worm and roller

Standard equipment

New car price included the following items:
 Boyce MotoMeter
 automatic windshield cleaner
 shock absorbers
 inspection lamp and cord
 bumpers front and rear
 spare tire
 rear view mirror
 headlight dimmer
 thief-proof lock

 clock
 smoking case
 vanity case
 dome light and corner lights

Optional equipment
The following was available in new models at an extra cost:
 Hydraulic four-wheel brakes with disc wheels
 Spare wheel

See also
Carl Breer

Sources

References

External links

Big Six
Rear-wheel-drive vehicles
Coupés
Sedans
1910s cars
1920s cars